The 2017 Sun Belt conference football season began on August 31, 2017 and ended on December 2, 2017. It was part of the 2017 season of the Football Bowl Subdivision (FBS), the top level of NCAA Division I football.

Season
This was the first season for Coastal Carolina, which was in its second and final transitional season from the Division I Football Championship Subdivision (FCS) to FBS. This was also the final season for both Idaho and New Mexico State as associate members of the conference; New Mexico State will remain in the FBS as an independent program, while Idaho will move down to the FCS level in its main conference, the Big Sky Conference.

Records against FBS conferences

Power Five conferences and independents

Group of Five conferences

FCS Subdivision

Postseason

Awards and honors

Individual Awards
Player of the Year: Ja'Von Rolland-Jones, Sr., DL, Arkansas State
Offensive Player of the Year: Justice Hansen, Jr., QB, Arkansas State
Defensive Player of the Year: Jeremy Reaves, Sr., DB, South Alabama
Freshman of the Year: Marcus Jones, DB/KR, Troy
Newcomer of the Year: Ron LaForce, Jr., DB, New Mexico State
Coach of the Year: Neal Brown, Troy

All-Conference Teams
Offense:

Defense:

Special Teams:

Ref:

Home attendance

Bold: Exceeded capacity
†Season High

References